Charam-e Kohneh (also known as Charam) is a village in Kabud Gonbad Rural District, in the Central District of Kalat County, Razavi Khorasan Province, Iran. At the 2006 census, its population was 991, in 248 families.

References 

Populated places in Kalat County